Fujiwara no Atsushige (藤原 篤茂; dates unknown, but active in the tenth century) was a Japanese nobleman and kanshi (classical Chinese) poet of the Heian period.

Biography 
The poet Fujiwara no Atsushige was the son of Yorinari (遂業), the governor of Bichū Province. His date of birth is unknown, but he was active around the mid-10th century.

In Ōwa 3 (963), he took part in a poetry competition at the residence of Miyoshi Michimune (三善道統), the Zen Shūsai-taku Shi-awase (善秀才宅詩合), where he was selected to act as a judge. Later, he was awarded the Junior Fifth Rank, Upper Grade, but he bemoaned his having spent a decade at the Zusho-ryō and stagnating in the Fifth Rank, and so made a request to be assigned the governorship of Awaji Province.

It is unknown when Atsushige died.

 Poetry 
There is evidence in early sources that Atsushige's poetry was highly regarded in its time, but very few specimens survive. What is extant was included in anthologies such as the Wakan Rōei-shū and the '', compiled in the early 11th and early 12th centuries, respectively.

Notes

References

Citations

Works cited 

 

Kanshi poets
10th-century Japanese poets
Kuge
Fujiwara clan
Year of birth unknown
Year of death unknown